Members of the New South Wales Legislative Assembly who served in the 50th parliament held their seats from 1991 to 1995. They were elected at the 1991 state election, and at by-elections. The Speaker was Kevin Rozzoli.

See also
Second Greiner ministry
First Fahey ministry
Second Fahey ministry
Third Fahey ministry
Results of the 1991 New South Wales state election (Legislative Assembly)
Candidates of the 1991 New South Wales state election

References

Members of New South Wales parliaments by term
20th-century Australian politicians